HD 4308 is a single star in the southern constellation of Tucana. It has a yellow hue and is a challenge to view with the naked eye even under good seeing conditions, having an apparent visual magnitude of 6.54. This object is located at a distance of 72 light years, as determined from parallax measurements. It is a population II star and is considered to be a member of the thick disk. The star is receding from the Sun with a radial velocity of +95 km/s.

This is a Sun-like G-type main-sequence star with a stellar classification of G6VFe-0.9, where the suffix notation indicates an underabundance of iron in the spectrum. The age of the star is poorly constrained, with estimated ranging from 1.6 billion years up to 10 billion. It has 95% of the mass of the Sun but 104% of the Sun's radius. The star is radiating nearly the same luminosity as the Sun from its photosphere at an effective temperature of 5,714 K.

Planetary system
In 2005, a low-mass planet was found in orbit around this star using the radial velocity method with the HARPS spectrograph. It is following a circular orbit close to its host star with a period of just 15.6 days. Unusual for a star with planets, HD 4308 has a metallicity lower than that of the Sun.

See also
 HARPS spectrograph
 HD 4203
 HD 4208
 List of extrasolar planets

References

External links
 

G-type main-sequence stars
Planetary systems with one confirmed planet
Tucana (constellation)
Durchmusterung objects
Gliese and GJ objects
004308
003497